Akash Mishra  (born 27 November 2001) is an Indian professional footballer who plays as a defender for Indian Super League club Hyderabad and the India national team.

Club career

Early life and youth career 
Born in Uttar Pradesh, Akash began his football career by joining the U Dream Football Academy in 2015. He stayed at the U Dream Football Academy in Germany for three-years, and returned to India in 2018, when Indian Arrows came calling for Akash after he made it to the India U18 team.

Indian Arrows 
Akash penned his first professional contract with I-League club Indian Arrows. He made his professional debut in the 2018–19 I-League season against Shillong Lajong FC on 13 January 2019 as a substitute for Rohit Danu, which ended in a 0–3 victory for Indian Arrows. He made it to the lineup for the first time against NEROCA FC on 1 February, which ended in a 2–3 defeat for the Arrows. Akash played his last match of the season on 24 February 2019 against Real Kashmir FC, which ended in a thrilling 2–2 draw. He stayed at the club for the 2019–20 I-League season, and played his first of the season against Gokulam Kerala on 6 December 2019, which Indian Arrows lost 0–1. Akash played his last match for the club against TRAU FC on 8 March 2020, which ended 0–1 to TRAU. After the 2019–20 I-League season, after making 23 appearances over two seasons for the club, Akash left Indian Arrows for the Indian Super League club Hyderabad FC.

Hyderabad

2020–21 ISL season: Debut and breakthrough 
On 16 October 2020, it was announced that Hyderabad FC have signed Akash Mishra, along with Rohit Danu and Biaka Jongte under a three-year contract. He made his debut on 23 November 2020 in Hyderabad's opening match of the season against Odisha, which ended 0–1 to Hyderabad. Mishra had an impressive spell with the club, and was one of the developmental players to clock most number of minutes during the season. After his standout performance in the month of January in 2021, he was awarded with the Emerging Player of the Month award by the Indian Super League jury. He gradually developed into one of the most important players in the team, and won his first ever Hero of the Match award in the match against SC East Bengal on 12 February 2021, which ended in a 1–1 draw. Akash had a tremendous debut season, as he appeared in every match for Hyderabad in the 2020–21 Indian Super League season, and was ranked second for the most number of tackles made by a defender that season with 80 tackles in his name, and was also ranked second in terms of most number of interceptions by a player that season with a figure of 55 interceptions, and 48 clearances, and 37 blocks in his name in his debut ISL campaign.

On 21 June 2022, Hyderabad FC announced that Akash Mishra has penned a new three-year contract extension till the end of the 2024–25 season. However, during his stay in Japan, the possibility of joining J2 League side Machida Zelvia came out but he was retained by Hyderabad and appeared in pre-season training ahead of the 2022 Durand Cup kickoff.

International career

Youth 
Akash was a part of India national under-20 football team, that won the 2019 SAFF U-18 Championship in Bangladesh. He played seven matches in the tournament, and scored two goals along the way. After the SAFF U-18 Championship, Akash was again called-up for the under-18 team to compete in the 2019 Granatkin Memorial tournament. He scored a goal in the last group stage match of India against Bulgaria on 9 June 2019, which helped India to clinch a 1–1 draw. Akash appeared in all three matches for India in the tournament, and registered one goal in his name.

Senior 
Akash was included in the 35-member list of probables for the India national team's back-to-back International Friendlies against Oman and UAE. On 25 March 2021, he made his senior international debut in a friendly match against Oman, along with 9 other debutants, which ended in a 1–1 draw. He was then called-up for the Indian squad to play their rest of the matches in the 2022 FIFA World Cup qualifiers against Qatar, Bangladesh and Afghanistan respectively. In March 2022, he was included in the national squad ahead of India's two friendly matches against Bahrain and Belarus.

Style of play 
Akash is a left-back, who is praised by many for his prolific display down the flanks. He is known for his positioning on the pitch, and is also known for his crosses down the wings. His coach at Hyderabad, Manolo Marquez, praised him, after he made his debut for the club in the post-match conference by adding, "I think he [Akash] is a very quiet player. He has a very good mentality, and for me, he will be one of the best left-backs in India soon. I think he is a very good left-back." Akash is considered to be one of the best young talents in Indian football.

Personal life 
Akash was born on 27 November 2001 in Balrampur in Uttar Pradesh. In an interview with The New Indian Express, he told that he used to play cricket in his early childhood, but left the sport to play football, after seeing his elder cousin brother play the sport.

Career statistics

Club

International

Honours 
Hyderabad
 Indian Super League: 2021–22

References

External links 

 
 
 
 Akash Mishra at Indian Super League
 Akash Mishra at Hyderabad FC

2001 births
Living people
People from Balrampur
Footballers from Uttar Pradesh
Indian footballers
Association football defenders
India international footballers
India youth international footballers
I-League players
Indian Super League players
Indian Arrows players
Hyderabad FC players